Juan Rafael Mora Porras (8 February 1814, San José, Costa Rica – 30 September 1860) was President of Costa Rica from 1849 to 1859.

Life and career
He first assumed the presidency following the resignation of his younger brother, Miguel Mora Porras, and was subsequently reelected in 1853 and 1859.

His administration modified the constitution, increasing the requirements to hold citizenship. A high yearly income was required to be a citizen; this left the majority of the population without the right to vote or run for office. The previous electoral system required citizens to be male, to be born in the country, and to be of age to have electoral rights.

This dramatic change coincided with the privatization of the commons; the landless peasants who depended on the commons were left helpless since they had no political representation and no means of achieving it given the changes in the new constitution.

In 1856 he led his country's forces in Central America's Filibuster War against William Walker and his filibuster regime in Nicaragua.

For Costa Rican historiography the war is divided into three parts:  The First Campaign (March–April 1856), The Second Campaign or Transit Campaign (October 1856–May 1857), and The Third Campaign (August–December 1857)

Mora, along with Bishop Anselmo Llorente had previously given a series of speeches to arouse the people preparing for the upcoming war. The speeches emphasized the threat posed by the Protestant filibusters to the country's Catholic identity.

The president gave his brother José Joaquín Mora Porras the supreme command of the army. Three battles were fought during the First Campaign: Santa Rosa, Sardinal and Rivas; these series of battles managed to stop Walker's invasion to Guanacaste—at the time known as "Moracia" in the president's honour.

During the Rivas Battle Cholera spread out on both filibuster and Costa Rican forces. Costa Ricans under the impression that cholera was acquired on "ill-aired" locations fled from Rivas taking the water-borne disease into the country causing the death of 10% of the population.

For Costa Ricans the war was postponed until October 1856, the starting point for The Second Campaign. The emphasis of the Second Campaign was to cut off Walker's supply route which used the San Juan River and the steamboats taken by the filibusters from the Accessory Transit Company.

There is no knowledge of the Third Campaign.

There is still discussion on the intellectual authorship of the capture of the Rio San Juan.  Some Costa Ricans, like historian Rafael Obregón Loría, claim it was Mora who planned the capture.  However, Mora met on November 1856 with Silvanius Spencer, Cornelius Vanderbilt's agent, who offered his help on the capture of the San Juan river.

In spite of earning acclaim as a national hero for his efforts in that endeavor, he was overthrown in a coup d'état orchestrated by his opponent Jose Maria Montealegre in August 1859. He fled to El Salvador, where his supporters convinced him to launch an attack on Costa Rica and recoup the presidency. After initial victories, in which he succeeded in seizing the port of Puntarenas, he was defeated, captured, and, on 30 September 1860, brought before a firing squad.

His nephew, whom he helped raise, was the writer Manuel Argüello Mora. His great-great-great-niece is actress Madeleine Stowe.

References

1814 births
1860 deaths
People from San José, Costa Rica
Costa Rican people of Spanish descent
Presidents of Costa Rica
Vice presidents of Costa Rica
Executed presidents
Executed Costa Rican people
People executed by Costa Rica by firing squad
19th-century executions by Costa Rica
19th-century Costa Rican people
Costa Rican liberals